The men's Straight rail (as partie libre) singles tournament at the 2002 Asian Games in Busan took place from 2 October to 4 October at Dongju College Gymnasium.

Schedule
All times are Korea Standard Time (UTC+09:00)

Results
Legend
WO — Won by walkover

References 
2002 Asian Games Official Report, Page 293

External links 
 Official Website

Cue sports at the 2002 Asian Games